Mimiculus maculatus is a species of beetle in the family Cerambycidae, and the only species in the genus Mimiculus. It was described by Karl Jordan in 1894.

References

Crossotini
Beetles described in 1894
Monotypic beetle genera